High School Musical: The Musical: The Series: The Soundtrack: Music from the Disney+ Original Series is the soundtrack album for the first season of the streaming television series High School Musical: The Musical: The Series, which was released on January 10, 2020, by Walt Disney Records. The program itself was first distributed on streaming service Disney+ on November 12, 2019; following a preview simulcast on ABC, Disney Channel and Freeform on November 8, 2019.

The soundtrack for the series features new songs and renditions of songs from the original High School Musical film.

Background and composition
Series creator Tim Federle originally pitched High School Musical: The Musical: The Series for Disney+ with the idea of developing original songs to complement the franchise's back catalogue. The first season contains ten original songs, with one new piece of music featured in each episode.

Composition
The soundtrack features new recordings of songs from the original High School Musical film; "Start of Something New", "What I've Been Looking For", "Breaking Free", "Stick to the Status Quo", "Bop to the Top", "When There Was Me and You" and "We're All in This Together". The songs were "revamped" for the series. Steve Vincent, who worked on the original films, served as the musical supervisor for the series and sourced several composers to write new music. He also received submissions from songwriters based in Los Angeles. Cast member Olivia Rodrigo wrote an original song for the series, "All I Want"; and co-wrote "Just for a Moment" with Joshua Bassett and music producer, Dan Book.

Lucas Grabeel, who played Ryan Evans in the original films, appears as featured artist in the song "Role of a Lifetime" alongside cast member Kate Reinders. Federle confirmed that a cast member from the original film would make a cameo appearance in the series through a fantasy sequence.

Kelly Lawler of USA Today suggested that the original songs echo "2019 high-energy pop music", referring to "I Think I Kinda, You Know" and "Wondering".

Songs and lyrical content
The song "I Think I Kinda, You Know" details the relationship between characters Nini and Ricky. Rodrigo elaborated, "it was the song that Nini played for Ricky before they broke up." "Wondering" is a piano duet performed in-series by Nini and Ashlyn, written to potentially be included in their version of the musical. The lyrics relate to Nini's romantic involvement with Ricky and E.J. "Born to Be Brave" is described an "empowering" track resembling "We're All in This Together" from the original film. "A Billion Sorrys" is a song written by E.J. in the series as an apology to Nini for stealing her phone and reading her messages.

Promotion

Release
The first song from the soundtrack, "The Medley, the Mashup" was released as a single on November 1, 2019, with an accompanying music video on the DisneyMusicVEVO YouTube account. The track is presented as a mashup of the original film's songs.

Pre-orders for the soundtrack were opened on November 8, 2019. In the lead-up to the album's release, selected tracks were made available weekly to correlate with the episodes being distributed. After the preview telecast of the series, the songs "I Think I Kinda, You Know" (Duet) and "Start of Something New" (Nini Version) were released. On November 12, "Wondering" was released at the same time as the program's Disney+ premiere. This was followed by "A Billion Sorrys", which was added to the pre-release on November 19, and the release of "What I've Been Looking For" (Nini & E.J. Version) and "All I Want" on November 26. "Born to Be Brave" was made available on December 3, followed by "When There was Me and You" (Ricky Version) and "Truth, Justice and Songs in Our Key" on December 10, and "Out of the Old" on December 17. On December 24, "Role of a Lifetime" was released, while "Just for a Moment" and the performance versions of "Get'cha Head in the Game" and "Stick to the Status Quo" were added to the soundtrack on December 31.

Live performances
The cast of High School Musical: The Musical: The Series performed "Start of Something New" and "We're All in This Together" at D23 Expo on August 23, 2019 and on Good Morning America on November 8, 2019.

Reception
Megan Vick of TV Guide commended Rodrigo and Julia Lester's vocal abilities in the song "Wondering".

Track listing

Charts

Weekly charts

Year-end charts

See also
High School Musical (soundtrack)

References

High School Musical albums
2020 soundtrack albums
Walt Disney Records soundtracks
Cast recordings
Television soundtracks
High School Musical: The Musical: The Series